Iryna Khliustava (born 25 August 1978, in Luninets) is a Belarusian sprinter. She competed in the 4 × 400 m relay event at the 2000, 2004, 2008 and 2012 Summer Olympics.

References

Belarusian female sprinters
1978 births
Living people
Olympic athletes of Belarus
Athletes (track and field) at the 2000 Summer Olympics
Athletes (track and field) at the 2004 Summer Olympics
Athletes (track and field) at the 2008 Summer Olympics
Athletes (track and field) at the 2012 Summer Olympics
Universiade medalists in athletics (track and field)
Universiade bronze medalists for Belarus
World Athletics Indoor Championships medalists
Medalists at the 2001 Summer Universiade
Olympic female sprinters
People from Luninets District
Sportspeople from Brest Region